Deeply Regretted By... is a 1978 television play starring Joan O'Hara and Donall Farmer, with the script being written by Maeve Binchy. The movie is based upon the Binchy story Death of Kilburn that ran in The Irish Times and deals with issues of bigamy and emigration.

Synopsis
Deeply Regretted By... follows an unnamed London widow who discovers that her marriage was a sham and that her Irish "husband" had deep secrets that he had been keeping from her.

Awards and honours
Deeply Regretted By... won two Jacob's Awards for Binchy's script and Farmer's performance. It also won the Best Script Award at the Prague Film Festival in 1979.

References

External links
 Deeply Regretted By... at maevebinchy.com
 

Irish plays
Jacob's Award winners
1978 television plays
Works by Maeve Binchy
The Irish Times
Irish television shows
1978 in Irish television